The 1956 PGA Championship  was the 38th edition of the professional golf competition, held at Blue Hill Country Club in Canton, Massachusetts, a suburb southwest of Boston. Jack Burke Jr. won his second major championship of 1956, a 3 & 2 victory over Ted Kroll; Burke had won the Masters in April.  It was the penultimate PGA Championship as a match play competition; stroke play was introduced two years later in 1958. This was the tenth and final year the PGA Championship was scheduled for a Tuesday finish.

Defending champion Doug Ford was stopped in the third round by 1953 champion Walter Burkemo, 5 & 3.

Blue Hill was not highly regarded as a championship venue and calls increased for a change in format to stroke play. Also, a five-year membership in the PGA of America was necessary to compete in the PGA Championship at the time; this excluded young professionals Arnold Palmer, Dow Finsterwald, Gene Littler, and Mike Souchak.

This remains the only time the PGA Championship has been played in Massachusetts. It was the 8th major championship played in the state and the first in over 30 years, since the 1925 U.S. Open. The next major held in the state would be the 1963 U.S. Open.

Burke was the second to win the Masters and PGA Championship in the same calendar year, following Sam Snead in 1949. Through 2016, it has only been accomplished four times, with the latter two by Jack Nicklaus in 1963 and 1975.

The Open Championship was held two weeks earlier in England at Royal Liverpool Golf Club; neither Burke nor Kroll played in 1956 (or ever).

Format
The match play format at the PGA Championship was modified in 1956 and called for 9 rounds (162 holes) in five days, Friday through Tuesday. Previously, a two-day stroke play qualifying segment (36 holes) on Wednesday and Thursday preceded the match play competition to narrow the field to 64 competitors.  This year, 128 players were entered in the single-elimination bracket. The first five rounds were 18-hole matches contested over the first three days, which reduced the field to four players. The semifinals and finals were 36-hole matches played on the final two days, Monday and Tuesday.
 Friday – first round, 18 holes
 Saturday – second and third rounds, 18 holes each
 Sunday – fourth round and quarterfinals, 18 holes each
 Monday – semifinals – 36 holes
 Tuesday – final – 36 holes

Past champions in the field

Final results
Tuesday, July 24, 1956

Final eight bracket
In the Sunday quarterfinals, Ted Kroll defeated favorite Sam Snead 2 & 1. In the semifinals, Kroll needed only 28 holes to handily defeat Bill Johnston 10 & 8, but Burke's match went 37 holes, extended to an extra hole to stop Ed Furgol, the 1954 U.S. Open champion. In the final on Tuesday, Burke was three holes down to Kroll after 19 holes, then won five of the next seven holes. The two then halved the next seven holes and Kroll's bogey at the par-3 34th hole ended the match at 3 & 2.

Final match scorecards
Morning

Afternoon

Source:

References

External links
PGA Media Guide 2012
PGA.com – 1956 PGA Championship

PGA Championship
Golf in Massachusetts
Sports competitions in Massachusetts
Canton, Massachusetts
Sports in Norfolk County, Massachusetts
PGA Championship
PGA Championship
PGA Championship
PGA Championship